Afton may refer to:

Places

Canada
 Afton River (Nova Scotia)
 Afton, Nova Scotia
 Afton, Prince Edward Island
 Afton Station, Nova Scotia

United Kingdom
 River Afton, Ayrshire, Scotland
 Glen Afton, Ayrshire, Scotland
 Afton Reservoir, Ayrshire, Scotland
 Afton, Isle of Wight

United States
Afton, Glenn County, California
Afton, San Bernardino County, California
Afton, Delaware
Afton, Georgia
Afton, Iowa
Afton, Louisiana
Affton, Missouri
Afton, Michigan
Afton, Charlevoix County, Michigan, ghost town
Afton, Minnesota
Afton, Nevada
Afton, New Jersey
Afton, New Mexico
Afton (town), New York 
Afton (village), New York
Afton, Ohio
Afton, Oklahoma
Afton, Tennessee
Afton, Texas
Afton, Virginia
Afton, Wisconsin
Afton, West Virginia
Afton, Wyoming
Afton Center, Illinois
Afton Run, North Carolina
Afton Township, Arkansas
Afton Township, Iowa
Afton Township, DeKalb County, Illinois
Afton Township, Sedgwick County, Kansas
Afton Township, North Dakota
Afton Township, Brookings County, South Dakota
Afton Township, Sanborn County, South Dakota
Afton State Park, Minnesota

Given name
Afton Williamson, American actress (born 1984)
Afton Cooper, fictional character from the television series Dallas
William Afton, fictional character from the game "Five Nights at Freddy's".

Businesses
Afton Chemical, American petroleum additives manufacturer